The Aix-les-Bains–Annemasse railway is a railway line in the Auvergne-Rhône-Alpes region of France. It runs  from Aix-les-Bains to Annemasse.

References

External links 
 

Railway lines in Auvergne-Rhône-Alpes
25 kV AC railway electrification